Typhoon Khanun, known in the Philippines as Typhoon Kiko, was the strongest tropical cyclone to make landfall on Zhejiang Province since Wanda in 1956. Khanun developed from an area of convection east-southeast of Yap on September 5, thereafter tracking northwestward. The precursor reached tropical storm status on September 7 and typhoon intensity the next day. The tropical cyclone reached its peak intensity on September 10 with winds estimated at 155 km/h (100 mph) and a minimum barometric pressure of 945 mbar (hPa; 27.91 inHg). After weakening slightly, Khanun moved ashore Zhejiang Province the next day, weakening further as it tracked over land. After recurving into the Yellow Sea on September 12, Khanun became extratropical; these remnants continued to track into the open North Pacific before they were last noted on September 16.

Meteorological history

Khanun arose from a persistent area of convection centered roughly 175 mi (280 km) east-southeast of Yap in early September. The Japan Meteorological Agency (JMA) designated the storm cluster as a tropical depression at 0000 UTC on September 5. The cyclone developed a favorable wind pattern that consolidated near its center. Tracking towards the northwest, the system intensified to tropical storm status east of the Philippines at 0000 UTC on September 7. As a result, the JMA named the system Khanun. Similarly, since the storm entered the area of responsibility of the Philippine Atmospheric, Geophysical and Astronomical Services Administration (PAGASA), the administration designated the tropical cyclone with the name Kiko.

With its trajectory determined primarily by a nearby ridge, Khanun gradually intensified, reaching typhoon intensity at 1800 UTC on September 8, southeast of Okinawa. A slight northerly curve brought Khanun to a landfall in Zhejiang Province at 0600 UTC the next day At the time of landfall, the storm harbored sustained winds of 140 km/h (85 mph) Afterwards, Khanun quickly weakened, and was already downgraded to tropical storm status by the day's end. After making a curve northeastwards into the Yellow Sea, the JMA determined that the diffuse storm had fully transitioned into an extratropical cyclone on September 13, and shortly thereafter the JMA no longer monitored the system as a cohesive cyclone.. The resultant vortex tracked rapidly across the Sea of Japan before reentering the northwestern Pacific Ocean; it was last noted over open waters on September 16.

Preparations and impact

Japan
As Khanun approached the Ryukyu Islands, Japan Airlines and All Nippon Airways cancelled at least 70 flights combined linking those islands to other locations in Japan. The impending typhoon also forced scheduling changes in the running of ongoing election processes on Ishigaki Island. As the cyclone moved through the islands, moderate rain was documented. In the Okinawa Prefecture, the winds and rain caused one injury and damaged 173 power lines. These felled lines resulted in widespread power outages. Damage to crops there totaled ¥150 million (US$1.4 million). The storm's impacts forced the cancellation of flights in addition to shipping routes between Okinawa Island and the Sakishima Islands. Further north in Aomori Prefecture, flights were also suspended. Heavy rains caused 31 landslides and caused flooding. Eleven homes were inundated by these floodwaters, and an additional 1,000 residences were impacted by power outages resulting from wind damage.

China
The city of Taizhou, Zhejiang bore the initial brunt of the storm as it was close to where the storm made landfall, 220 km south of Shanghai. Other coastal cities  braced for the typhoon as it headed north. At least 14 people were killed and 1 went missing in Zhejiang province. Damages totaled to $849 million (2005 USD).

See also

Typhoon Fred (1994)
Typhoon Rananim
Typhoon Winnie (1997)

Notes

References

External links

JMA General Information of Typhoon Khanun (0515) from Digital Typhoon
JMA Best Track Data of Typhoon Khanun (0515) 
15W.KHANUN from the U.S. Naval Research Laboratory

Khanun
Khanun 2005
Khanun 2005
Khanun 2005
Khanun
Khanun
Khanun